Ze'ev Friedman (10 June 1944 – 6 September 1972) was an Israeli flyweight weightlifter. A member of the Israeli Olympic team, he was killed in the 1972 Munich Olympics massacre.

Biography
 
Ze'ev Friedman was born in Prokopyevsk, Soviet Union in 1944. In 1960, he moved from Poland to Israel.  He began his sports career as a gymnast, but later switched to weightlifting. He was a member of Hapoel Kiryat Haim sports club. He won a bronze medal at the 1971 Asian Weightlifting Championships.

In 1972,  Ze'ev Friedman competed at the 1972 Summer Olympics in Munich, West Germany as a weightlifter.  He placed 12th, one of the best achievements of any Israeli athlete at the time.  On 5 September, members of the Palestinian Black September group broke into the Israeli team's dormitory and took hostage several Israeli athletes and coaches including Friedman. After protracted negotiations, the kidnappers brought the hostages to an airport via helicopter and killed them during an attempted rescue by Munich police and Bavarian border guards. The autopsy report, by the Forensic Institute of the University of Munich, concluded that Friedman had died from internal bleeding and also noted that a watch worn by the 28-year old weight lifter was still ticking when the autopsy began, giving a time of 7:51pm.

References

Further reading
Groussard, S. (New York, 1975), The Blood of Israel: The massacre of the Israeli athletes, The Olympics, 1972 

1944 births
1972 deaths
People from Prokopyevsk
Israeli male weightlifters
Jewish Israeli sportspeople
Jewish weightlifters
Weightlifters at the 1972 Summer Olympics
Olympic weightlifters of Israel
Victims of the Munich massacre
Deaths by firearm in Germany
Polish emigrants to Israel
Soviet emigrants to Poland